Lobão, Gião, Louredo e Guisande is a civil parish in the municipality of Santa Maria da Feira, Portugal. It was formed in 2013 by the merger of the former parishes Lobão, Gião, Louredo and Guisande. The population in 2011 was 9,860, in an area of 23.58 km2.

References

Freguesias of Santa Maria da Feira